Ruth Thomas McVey (born October 22, 1930) is an American scholar of Indonesia and Southeast Asia known especially for her writings on Communism and the Indonesian Communist Party. With Benedict Anderson, she co-wrote the Cornell Paper, a 1966 work which examined the failed September 30 Movement in Indonesia. She has written and edited a number of books about Indonesian and Southeast Asian politics, including The rise of Indonesian communism (1965) and The Soviet view of the Indonesian revolution (1969).

Biography
McVey was born in Allentown, Pennsylvania in 1930. She attended Catasauqua High School, graduating in 1948. She then did a Bachelor of Arts at Bryn Mawr College with a focus in Russian language, graduating in 1952. She then got a Fulbright scholarship to study at the University of Amsterdam.

She studied political science at Harvard University, finishing her Master's degree in 1954 as a specialist on the Soviet Union. However, she soon switched the focus of her research from Russia to Indonesia, enrolling at Cornell University. McVey was part of a cohort of American academics who went to Jakarta to study the national politics of Indonesia starting in 1958; this included also Frederick Bunnell, Dan Lev, and Mary Somers. In 1961, she finished her PhD dissertation at Cornell titled "The Comintern and the Rise of Indonesian Communism." During that time she was also involved in the founding and operating of the journal Indonesia.

In the fall of 1965, when the failed September 30 Movement coup changed the trajectory of Indonesian politics and initiated a violent retaliation from the Indonesian military, she was a researcher at the Cornell University Modern Indonesia Project. Along with fellow Cornell scholar Benedict Anderson, and with research assistance from Fred Bunnell, she wrote one of the first major English-language analyses of the events, a 162-page report entitled A Preliminary Analysis of the October 1, 1965, Coup in Indonesia (more commonly known as the Cornell Paper). They wrote the paper at Cornell by studying newspaper reports coming out of Indonesia, radio broadcasts, and communications with friends who were still in the country. They finished the report in January 1966; although it was marked "confidential" and only meant to be circulated among colleagues, it was soon being widely reproduced and read by diplomats and even Indonesian army officers. The paper caused a diplomatic stir; McVey was accused by anti-communists of being sympathetic to the Indonesian Communist Party and Anderson was banned from entering Indonesia.

She later became increasingly disillusioned with the American role in the academic study of Southeast Asia and its focus on "development" in the context of the Cold War; she left Cornell for the SOAS University of London in 1969 due to her opposition to U.S. involvement in the Vietnam War. She has since relocated to Montisi, Italy, where she lives on an Olive oil farm.

Selected publications
Bibliography of Soviet Publications on Southeast Asia (1959)
The rise of Indonesian communism (1965)
Indonesia (1967, as editor)
The Soviet view of the Indonesian revolution: a study in the Russian attitude towards Asian nationalism (1969)
The social roots of Indonesian communism (1970)
Southeast Asian capitalists (1992, as editor)
Redesiging the Cosmos: Belief Systems and State Power in Indonesia (1993)
Southeast Asia Studies: Reorientations (with Craig J. Reynolds, 1998)
Money & power in provincial Thailand (2000, as editor)

References

1930 births
Living people
Indonesianists
American women academics
Educators from Allentown, Pennsylvania
Catasauqua High School alumni
Historians of Southeast Asia
American women political scientists
American political scientists
Russian studies scholars
Harvard University alumni
Academics of SOAS University of London
Cornell University faculty
Bryn Mawr College alumni
21st-century American women